The 1994 Indiana Hoosiers football team represented Indiana University Bloomington as a member of the Big Ten Conference during the 1994 NCAA Division I-A football season. Led by 11th-year head coach Bill Mallory, the Hoosiers finished the season with an overall record of 6–5 and a mark of 3–5 in conference play, tying for ninth place in the Big Ten. The team played home games at Memorial Stadium in Bloomington, Indiana. 

After the season, Indiana's record was retroactively adjusted to 7–4 following NCAA violations incurred by Michigan State.

Schedule

1995 NFL draftees

References

Indiana
Indiana Hoosiers football seasons
Indiana Hoosiers football